Oskars Bārtulis (born January 21, 1987) is a retired Latvian professional ice hockey defenceman. He has previously played parts of two seasons in the National Hockey League (NHL) with the Philadelphia Flyers. In 2018, Bartulis became a Russian citizen and therefore ineligible to play for Latvia at national level.

Playing career
Bārtulis was a winger and didn't start playing defence until he was drafted 27th overall by the Moncton Wildcats in the 2004 Canadian Hockey League (CHL) European Draft. He was drafted after just one season with the Wildcats in the third round, 91st overall, in the 2005 NHL Entry Draft by the Philadelphia Flyers. He was traded to the Cape Breton Screaming Eagles at the 2006 Canadian Hockey League Import Draft.

He signed a three-year entry level contract with the Philadelphia Flyers on September 23, 2006 following training camp. However, due to junior eligibility, he was returned to the Quebec Major Junior Hockey League (QMJHL) two days later.

Bārtulis made his NHL debut against the Ottawa Senators on November 12, 2009, going scoreless and playing 17:18 minutes of ice time. Impressed with his play after his first 10 games with the team, the Flyers signed Bārtulis to a three-year contract extension on December 2.

On February 22, 2011 Bārtulis received a late hit from former Philadelphia Flyer Scottie Upshall, resulting in a Labral tear of the shoulder. The injury forced Bartulis out for the rest of the season and Scottie Upshall was issued a two-game suspension for the hit. Upshall later apologized and admitted after viewing the replay the hit was late.

On June 30, 2012 Bārtulis' $600,000 contract was bought out by the Flyers after spending the 2011–12 season with the Flyers AHL affiliate.

Entering his seventh season in the KHL in 2018–19, Bārtulis' belatedly signed a one-year contract in joining his fifth club in Chinese outfit, Kunlun Red Star, on November 13, 2018.

Career statistics

Regular season and playoffs

International

Awards and honours

References

External links

 

1987 births
Adirondack Phantoms players
Admiral Vladivostok players
Barys Nur-Sultan players
Dinamo Riga players
HC Donbass players
Ice hockey players at the 2010 Winter Olympics
Ice hockey players at the 2014 Winter Olympics
HC Kunlun Red Star players
Latvian ice hockey defencemen
Living people
Moncton Wildcats players
Olympic ice hockey players of Latvia
People from Ogre, Latvia
Philadelphia Flyers draft picks
Philadelphia Flyers players
Philadelphia Phantoms players
Salavat Yulaev Ufa players